Émile Swinnen was a Belgian hurdler. He competed in the men's 400 metres hurdles at the 1928 Summer Olympics.

References

Athletes (track and field) at the 1928 Summer Olympics
Belgian male hurdlers
Olympic athletes of Belgium
Place of birth missing
Year of birth missing
Year of death missing